Modjaji Books is a South African small-scale independent publisher. Started in 2007 by Colleen Higgs, it is an independent press that publishes the writings of Southern African women. Many Modjaji titles have gone on to be nominated for and to win prestigious literary awards both in South Africa and internationally.

Modjaji Books is based in Cape Town, publishing books written exclusively by Southern African women. Currently, the company publishes short stories, memoir, novels, poetry, and creative non-fiction.

Modjaji Books aims to fill a gap by providing an independent outlet for serious writing by women: "From poetry to biography to fiction, there will be an outlet for writing by women that takes itself – and its readers – seriously."

The Modjaji Books blog is frequently updated and features reviews, news, articles and insights on South African publishing. The blog is available on Books LIVE.

Selected publications

 A Saving Bannister by Wendy Woodward
 Accident by Dawn Garisch 
 Absent Tongues by Kelwyn Sole
 A lioness at my heels by Robin Winckel-Mellish
 At Least the Duck Survived by Margaret Clough
 The Attribute of Poetry by Elisa Galgut
 An A to Z of Amazing South African Women by Ambre Nicolson
 The Bed Book of Short Stories by Joanne Hichens
 Balthasar's Gift by Charlotte Otter
 Bare & Breaking by Karin Schimke
 Bom Boy by Yewande Omotoso
 Beyond Touch by Arja Salafranca
 Burnt Offering by Joan Metelerkamp
 Bearings by Isobel Dixon
 Conduit by Sarah Frost
 The Chameleon House by Melissa de Villiers
 The Cry of the Hangkaka by Anne Woodborne
 Do Not Go Gentle by Futhi Ntshingila
 Difficult to Explain by Finuala Dowling
 The Everyday Wife by Phillippa Yaa de Villiers
 Fourth Child by Megan Hall (Winner of the Ingrid Jonker prize)
 Flame and Song: a memoir by Phillippa Kabali-Kagwa
 Grace by Barbara Boswell
 Go Tell the Sun by Wame Molefhe
 Homegrown by Christine Coates
 How to open the door by Marike Beyers
 Hemispheres by Karen Lazar
 Hester's Book of Bread by Hester van der Walt
 Hester se Brood by Hester van der Walt
 I'm the Girl Who Was Raped by Michelle Hattingh
 Invisible Earthquake by Malika Ndlovu
 Ice cream headache in my bone by Phillippa Yaa de Villiers
 Jabulani Means Rejoice by Phumzile Simelane Kalumba
 Karkloof Blue by Charlotte Otter
 Life in Translation by Azila Talit Reisenberger
 The Last to Leave by Margaret Clough
 The Love Sheet by Jacques Coetzee and Barbara Fairhead
 Love Interrupted by Reneilwe Malatji
 My First Time by Jen Thorpe
 Messages from the Bees by Robin Winckel-Mellish
 Namaste Life by Ishara Maharaj
 Now Following You by Fiona Snyckers
 Now I See You by Priscilla Holmes
 Now the World Takes these Breaths by Joan Metelerkamp
 Nomme 20 Delphi Straat by Shirmoney Rhode
 Oleander by Fiona Zerbst
 Outside the Lines by Ameera Patel
 Please, Take Photographs by Sindiwe Magona
 Piece Work by Ingrid Andersen
 Running & other stories by Makhosazana Xaba
 Riding the Samoosa Express by Zaheera Jina and Hasina Asvat
 Remnants, Restante, Reste by Annette Snyckers
 Strange Fruit by Helen Moffett
 Serurunbele by Katleho Kano Shoro
 Signs for an exhibition by Eliza Kentridge
 The Suitable Girl by Michelle McGrane
 Shooting Snakes by Maren Bodenstein
 Snake by Tracey Farren
 Swimming with Cobras by Rosemary Smith
 STRAY by Helen Moffett and Diane Awerbuck (editors)
 Sê my, is julle twee susters? by Hester van der Walt
 Secret Keeper by Kerry Hammerton
 Team Trinity by Fiona Snyckers
 The Turtle Dove Told Me by Thandi Sliepen
 These are the lies I told you by Kerry Hammerton
 Tess by Tracey Farren
 The Thin Line by Arja Salafranca
 This Day by Tiah Beautement
 This Place I Call Home by Meg Vandermerwe
 Tjieng Tjang Tjerries and other stories by Jolyn Phillips
 To the Black Women We All Knew by Kholofelo Maenetsha
 Unlikely by Colleen Crawford Cousins
 UnSettled and other stories by Sandra Hill
 Whiplash by Tracey Farren (shortlisted for the 2009 Sunday Times Fiction prize)
 Witch Girl by Tanvi Bush

References

External links
 Official website

Book publishing companies of South Africa
Mass media in Cape Town
Companies based in Cape Town